The Virginia Mr. Basketball Award was given to the person chosen as the best high school boys basketball player in the U.S. state of Virginia.  The award winner was selected by  The Roanoke Times.

Award winners

Winners by high school

References

Mr. and Miss Basketball awards
Basketball in Virginia
Awards established in 1982
1982 establishments in Virginia
Lists of people from Virginia
Mr. Basketball